The FIBA Africa Championship 1987 was an international basketball tournament for teams in the International Basketball Federation's FIBA Africa zone hosted by Tunisia from December 17 to December 18, 1987.  The games were played in Tunis.  The top two countries in this FIBA Africa Championship earned the two berths allocated to Africa for the 1988 Summer Olympics in Seoul. Central African Republic won the tournament, the country's 2nd African championship, by beating Egypt in the final.

Competing Nations
The following national teams competed:

Preliminary rounds

Group A

Day 1

Day 2

Day 3

Group B

Day 1

Day 2

Day 3

Day 4

Day 5

Knockout stage

Classification stage

Final standings

C.A.R. rosterFrançois Naouéyama, Jean-Pierre Kotta, Guy Mbongo, Eugene Pehoua-Pelema, Richard Bella, Aubin Goporo, Anicet Lavodrama, Christian Gombé, Fred Goporo, Bruno Kongawoin, Kader Fall, Oumarou Sanda

Awards

External links
 FIBA Archive

References

1987 in African basketball
B
International basketball competitions hosted by Tunisia
AfroBasket
December 1987 sports events in Africa